The following is a list of episodes of the South Korean reality-variety show Let's Go! Dream Team Season 2, broadcast on KBS2 every Sunday.

There are currently 100 episodes (as of October 2, 2011) which have been aired.

2009

2010

2011

2012

2013

2014

2015

See also 
 Let's Go! Dream Team Season 2
episode 127

References 

Lists of variety television series episodes
Lists of South Korean television series episodes